Evelyn Kathleen Welch  (née Samuels; born 1959) is an American-English scholar of the Renaissance and Early Modern Period, and Vice Chancellor of the University of Bristol. Prior to her role as Vice Chancellor, Evelyn was the professor of Renaissance Studies, Provost, and Senior Vice President (Arts & Sciences) at King’s College London. She served as the Interim President and Principal of King's College London from February to June 2021.

Career
Welch was born Evelyn Kathleen Samuels in Boston, Massachusetts, the daughter of Ellen Richards and John S. Samuels III. Her younger brother is actor and film director John Stockwell. She was educated and raised in the United States, before moving to the United Kingdom in 1981. A graduate of Phillips Exeter Academy, Harvard University and of the Warburg Institute, University of London, she has held a professorship as well as the office of Provost for Arts & Sciences at King's College London since October 2016, having previously served as Vice-Principal for Arts & Sciences from 2013. Previously, she had been Vice-Principal (Research & International) at Queen Mary University of London, and Pro-Vice Chancellor (Teaching & Learning) at the University of Sussex. She was a member of the Victoria and Albert Museum Board of Trustees from 2012 to 2016, the British Library Advisory Board and is the chair of Trustees of the Dulwich Picture Gallery and the Advisory Board of the Warburg Institute. She specialises in the art of the Italian Renaissance, as well as material culture, on which she has published extensively.  Her books include Shopping in the Renaissance: Consumer Cultures in Italy, 1400–1600, a winner of the 2005 Wolfson History Prize. Her current work is on fashion in Renaissance and Early Modern Europe which was funded by the Humanities in the European Research Area (HERA). In 2016, she became a Wellcome Trust Senior Investigator award holder for her work on 'Renaissance Skin'. On 22 March 2022, the University of Bristol announced Welch's appointment as the next Vice Chancellor of the university. The first woman appointed to this post, she is due to take up the role on 1 September 2022.

Personal life
In 1982, Samuels married Nicholas Russell "Nick" Welch, an advertising copywriter, then creative director with J. Walter Thompson and Collett Dickenson Pearce in London; the couple divorced around 1999. She is the mother of singer and songwriter Florence Welch, frontwoman of the English rock band Florence and the Machine, and has two other children and three step-children. She is married to Professor Peter Openshaw, an immunologist and professor of experimental medicine at Imperial College London.

Selected works 
 Art and Authority in Renaissance Milan (Yale University Press, 1995)
 Art and Society in Italy, 1350-1500 (Oxford University Press, 1997); reissued as Art in Renaissance Italy: 1350–1500 (2000) from Oxford History of Art series
 Shopping in the Renaissance: Consumer Cultures in Italy, 1400–1600 (Yale University Press, 2005)
 The Material Renaissance [editor] (Manchester University Press, 2007)
 Making and Marketing Medicine in Renaissance Florence (Rodopi, 2011)
 Fashioning the Early Modern: Dress, Textiles and Innovation in Europe, 1500–1800 (Oxford University Press, 2017)

References

External links
 
 

1959 births
Living people
Academics of King's College London
American art historians
English art historians
Women art historians
Harvard University alumni
American emigrants to England
People from Boston
British women historians
American women historians
Historians from Massachusetts
Members of the Order of the British Empire
Fellows of King's College London
Phillips Exeter Academy alumni